The  is a Japanese chemical tanker that was hijacked by pirates off the coast of Somalia on 28 October 2007. In news reports, she has at times been mistakenly referred to as the Golden Nory and Golden Mori. At the time of the hijacking the 23 person crew was composed of citizens of South Korea, the Philippines, and Myanmar. One of the South Korean crew members successfully escaped soon after being taken hostage.

History
Golden Nori, which operates under a Panamanian flag, was reportedly seized by Somali pirates eight nautical miles off the coast of the East African nation. The United States Navy responded, sinking the pirates' skiffs. A few days later Capt. Restituto Bulilan was allowed to phone his family and the ship's owners to indicate that the crew was safe.

At the time she was hijacked, the cargo of the Golden Nori consisted of four different chemicals, including highly flammable benzene.

US and German naval vessels shadowed the captured vessel and blockaded from entering the port of Bosaso. Eventually, after demanding a ransom, the pirates freed the ship and its crew of 21 on December 12.

References

http://www.e-vrp.com/Vessel_Details.asp?VesselId=30068&PlanNum=1151 
 
 News | Africa - Reuters.com

External links
 
 2007 photo of Golden Nori

 

1996 ships
Merchant ships of Japan
Maritime incidents in 2007
Chemical tankers
Piracy in Somalia
Ships built in Japan